Paradise FM (callsign 2PAR) is a community radio station in Ballina, New South Wales.

Radio stations in New South Wales
Adult contemporary radio stations in Australia
Ballina, New South Wales